Biel is a village and municipality in the Trebišov District in the Košice Region of eastern Slovakia.

Ethnicity
The village is about 75% Hungarian.

See also
 List of municipalities and towns in Slovakia

References

Genealogical resources

The records for genealogical research are available at the state archive "Statny Archiv in Kosice, Slovakia"

 Roman Catholic church records (births/marriages/deaths): 1848-1904 (parish B)
 Greek Catholic church records (births/marriages/deaths): 1795-1905 (parish B)
 Reformated church records (births/marriages/deaths): 1809-1929 (parish B)

External links
Surnames of living people in Biel

Villages and municipalities in Trebišov District
Zemplín (region)